Wolf Trap is a census-designated place (CDP) in Fairfax County, Virginia, United States. The population was 16,131 at the 2010 census. Wolf Trap National Park for the Performing Arts is located in the CDP.

Geography
Wolf Trap is located in northern Fairfax County at  (38.933477, −77.276510). It is bordered by McLean to the northeast, Tysons Corner to the southeast, Vienna to the south, Oakton to the southwest, Reston to the west, and the community of Great Falls to the north. The Dulles Toll Road crosses the center of the CDP, with access from Exits 15 (Wolftrap Park) and 16 (Virginia State Route 7). Virginia Route 7 (Leesburg Pike) forms the northern border of the CDP; the highway leads northwest  to Leesburg.

Demographics

The racial makeup of the CDP was 79% White, 2% African American, 0% Native American, 14% Asian, 0.64% from other races, and 2.64% from two or more races. Hispanic or Latino of any race were 2.63% of the population.

There were 5,462 households, out of which 45.4% had children under the age of 18 living with them, 86.1% were married couples living together, 3.9% had a female householder with no husband present, and 8.6% were non-families. 6.3% of all households were made up of individuals, and 2.5% had someone living alone who was 65 years of age or older. The average household size was 3.07 and the average family size was 3.19.

Census also reports that the 2019 median income for a household in the Wolf Trap CDP was $222,908 (based on 2014-2018 data).

In popular culture

Wolf Trap is named as the location for FBI special investigator Will Graham (Hugh Dancy)'s home in NBC's 2013 TV series Hannibal, although the actual filmed location of the house is in the hamlet of Whitevale, Ontario.

References

Census-designated places in Fairfax County, Virginia
Census-designated places in Virginia
Washington metropolitan area